Josias Tusevo Lukembila (born 9 September 1999) is a Swiss professional footballer who plays as a winger for Wil.

Club career
On 14 June 2019, Lukembila signed his first professional contract with Lausanne-Sport. He made his professional debut with the club in a 2–0 Swiss Super League win over Vaduz on 17 December 2020.

On 30 August 2021, he signed a two-year contract with Wil.

International career
Born in Switzerland, Lukembila is of Congolese descent. He is a youth international for Switzerland.

References

External links
 
 SFL Profile

1999 births
Swiss people of Democratic Republic of the Congo descent
Sportspeople from Lausanne
Living people
Swiss men's footballers
Switzerland youth international footballers
Association football wingers
FC Lausanne-Sport players
FC Wil players
Swiss Super League players
Swiss Challenge League players